Hydroxyethylpromethazine is an antihistamine with anticholinergic properties. It is structurally analogous to promethazine.

See also 
 Promethazine

References 

H1 receptor antagonists
Muscarinic antagonists
Phenothiazines
Quaternary ammonium compounds
Primary alcohols